Eudiaptomus chappuisi is a species of crustacean in the family Diaptomidae. It is endemic to Morocco.

References

Sources

Fauna of Morocco
Diaptomidae
Freshwater crustaceans of Africa
Crustaceans described in 1926
Endemic fauna of Morocco
Taxonomy articles created by Polbot